Nastik may refer to:

 Nastika, Indian philosophical schools and persons that do not accept the authority of the Vedas as supreme; the word is often translated as "atheist"
 Nastik (1954 film), a 1954 Bollywood film by I. S. Johar starring Nalini Jaywant and Ajit
 Nastik (1983 film), a 1983 Bollywood film by Pramod Chakravorthy
 Nastik (upcoming film), an upcoming Bollywood film by Shailesh Varma starring Arjun Rampal and Harshaali Malhotra

See also 
 Nastic (disambiguation)